Barack Obama is an American attorney who served as President of the United States from 2009 to 2017.

Barack may also refer to:

 Barack (name), including a list of people with the name
 Barack (brandy), a Hungarian apricot brandy

See also

 Barac (disambiguation)
 Baraq (disambiguation)
 Barak (disambiguation)
 Barrack (disambiguation)
 Buraq (disambiguation)
 Burack (disambiguation)